Lóngwángmiào may refer to the following locations in China:

Towns
 Longwangmiao, Daming County, Hebei
 Longwangmiao, Liaoning, in Donggang
 Longwangmiao, Shandong, in Shan County

Township
 Longwangmiao Township, Qinglong Manchu Autonomous County, Hebei

Village
 Longwangmiao, Gaocheng, a village in Gaocheng, Sui County, Suizhou, Hubei